Coleophora deviella is a moth of the family Coleophoridae. It is found from Denmark to Spain, Sardinia, Sicily and Greece and from Great Britain to southern Russia. It occurs in desert-steppe and desert biotopes.

The wingspan is 9–10 mm. There is one generation per year with adults on wing from late June to July in western Europe and from late May to June in Russia.

The larvae feed on the leaves and fruits of Bassia laniflora, Suaeda (including Suaeda maritima), Kochia, Salsola and Halostachys species. Full grown larvae live in a pale yellowish brown, trivalved, tubular silken case of about 9 mm with a mouth angle of 20-30°. Larvae can be found from August onwards. They are full-grown in October.

References

deviella
Moths described in 1847
Moths of Europe
Taxa named by Philipp Christoph Zeller